Ashraf Abdel Baqi (Arabic:أشرف عبد الباقي, born in 1963) is an Egyptian actor.

Early life
Ashraf Abdel Baqi was born in Hada'iq El Qobbah, he was the youngest, having 5 older siblings, three brothers and two sisters. He attended Ahmed Maher Elementary School, and Graduated from Nokrashy High school. At 12 years old Ashraf started working with his father as a contractor, devoting his time during summer and winter breaks to helping in the workshop. He started acting at the age of 16 in high school taking part in over 80 plays, whether front or backstage. During this time his parents disapproved of the idea of acting, his mother especially, as she was afraid of it affecting his education. However, Abdel Baqi's Parents later changed their opinion after he received support from his older brother, who took them to see one of Ashraf's plays. At 18, he opened up his own workshop specializing in Aluminum and different metals. Abdel Baqi then went on to study at Ain Shams University graduating in the class of 86' with a Business Degree. During which he picked up independent studies at the Higher Institute for dramatic arts between 1985 - 1987. There, he met other actors that would become Abdel Baqi's close friends, including Alaa Wali Eddin, Mohamed Henedi, Tarek Lotfy, and Alaa Morsy. He kept his job as a contractor during this time, also opening up a Decor showcase and office with one of his older brothers. Abdel Baqi only closed the workshops after his career as an actor took off.

Career
Actor

Film

Television series

Theater Performances

Talk Shows
Frequent host of Temporary Talk shows

Awards

Film Association Festival

National Cairo Cinema Festival

Catholic Film Festival

Arabic Cinema Festival

Alexandria Film Festival

References

External links
 

1963 births
Egyptian comedians
Egyptian male film actors
Male actors from Cairo
Living people